Utilita Energy is an electricity and gas supplier operating in the United Kingdom. Utilita began trading in 2003, specialising in pay-as-you-go metering. 

As of January 2021, Utilita has over 800,000 customers, representing a 2.6% share in the domestic market.

Company history 
Utilita Energy began trading in 2003, as a challenger to the dominant "Big Six" energy suppliers. The company's founder and Chief Executive Officer is Bill Bullen.

In 2008, Utilita became the first energy company in the UK to install a smart meter.

By 2014, the company had reached 100,000 customers. In 2018, Utilita launched their energy management app, My Utilita.

In October 2020, Utilita agreed to pay £500,000 in compensation and refund the affected customers, after the company reported itself to industry regulator Ofgem. Almost 40,000 customers had been overcharged a total of £125,000 during 2019.

Energy Hubs 
Utilita began a national rollout of high street Energy Hubs in 2018, allowing customers to top-up, check their account and get energy-saving advice in-store. As of December 2020, Utilita has Energy Hubs in Gosport, Southampton, Isle of Wight, Derby, West Bromwich, and Edinburgh.

Ownership 
Utilita has a long-standing partnership with Secure Meters, an Indian supplier of smart meters. In 2017 it was reported that Smart Meters held roughly two-thirds of the company's shares, while Bill Bullen retained 20%. The registered offices of Utilita Group, Utilita Energy and Secure Meters (UK) Ltd are in Eastleigh, Hampshire. Since December 2018, Bullen has had control of the group although "a preferred supplier" has unexercised options giving it the potential to take control.

Sponsorships 
Utilita was announced as the main shirt sponsor for Eastleigh F.C. from the 2016–17 season, the biggest in the club's history. The sponsorship has continued for a further four seasons.

In March 2018, Dundee United confirmed that Utilita would be the new shirt sponsor in a two-year deal from the 2018–19 season. A one-year extension was signed for the 2020–21 season. The deal ended after that season but the company became the official sleeve sponsor for the club for the 2021–22 season.

In 2019 Utilita was announced to be the shirt sponsor for Bristol Rovers on a one-year deal, which was extended for the 2020–21 season.

In July 2019, Utilita signed a deal with Scunthorpe United to become the shirt sponsor for the club for two seasons.

In August 2020, Brentford announced that Utilita would be the shirt sponsor for the 2020–21 season.

In March 2021, it was announced that Utilita would be the shirt sponsor for Huddersfield Town in a three-year deal starting from the 2021–22 season. In June 2021, Hibernian announced a two–year shirt sponsorship from the 2021–22 season.

Utilia sponsored The Football Yearbook (originally known as Rothmans' Football Yearbook) starting from its 52nd year, the 2021–22  season. 

In February 2022, during the second half of the 2021-22 season, Luton Town announced that Utilita would become the main sponsor for the club, after having invested in the club since 2017. Utilita remain the club's main sponsor as of the 2022-23 season.

They became the home shirt sponsors of Blackpool for the 2022–23 season.

References

External links

Electric power companies of the United Kingdom
Utilities of the United Kingdom
British companies established in 2003
Energy companies established in 2003
2003 establishments in England